Jason Kent Bateman (born January 14, 1969) is an American actor, director and producer known for his roles of Michael Bluth in the Fox/Netflix sitcom Arrested Development and of Marty Byrde in the Netflix crime drama series Ozark (2017–2022). 
He has received several awards including a Golden Globe Award, a Primetime Emmy Award, and three Screen Actors Guild Awards. In 2017 he received a star on the Hollywood Walk of Fame. 

He began his career as a child actor appearing on television in the early 1980s on shows such as the NBC drama series Little House on the Prairie from 1981 to 1982 and The Hogan Family from 1986 to 1991. 

 He has starred in the films Teen Wolf Too (1987), Necessary Roughness (1991), Dodgeball (2004), Juno (2007), Hancock (2008), Up in the Air, Extract (both 2009), The Switch (2010), The Change-Up (2011), Paul (2011), Horrible Bosses (2011) and its sequel (2014), Identity Thief (2013), This is Where I Leave You (2014), The Gift (2015), Office Christmas Party (2016), Zootopia (2016), and Game Night (2018). Since July 2020 he has co-hosted the comedy podcast SmartLess with Will Arnett and Sean Hayes.

Bateman made his directorial debut with the black comedy Bad Words (2013), in which he also starred. He has since directed and starred in The Family Fang (2015) and the Netflix crime drama series Ozark (2017–2022). Bateman was awarded the Primetime Emmy Award for Outstanding Directing for a Drama Series in 2019 for his directing of Ozark and has won three Screen Actors Guild Awards for his performance. In 2020 he had a recurring role in (and directed two episodes of) the HBO miniseries The Outsider.

Early life
Bateman was born in Rye, New York, and was four years old when his family moved to Salt Lake City, Utah, and later to California. His mother, Victoria Elizabeth, was a flight attendant for Pan Am who was originally from Shrewsbury in the United Kingdom. His father, Kent Bateman, is an American actor, writer, and director of film and television. His older sister is actress Justine Bateman. He also has three half-brothers.

Bateman never finished high school. In an interview with Wired Magazine, Bateman admitted that he never received his diploma due to not finishing his finals while filming Teen Wolf Too.

Bateman told Best Life magazine that he and Justine supported their parents with their earnings from their television shows; he also revealed that he was managed by his father until Bateman was 20 when the business relationship was dissolved.

Career

Television

Bateman first appeared in a cereal commercial for Golden Grahams in 1980 and began his television career on Little House on the Prairie as James Cooper, an orphaned boy who, along with his sister, is adopted by the Ingalls family. From 1982 to 1984 he was a supporting character on the television show Silver Spoons as Ricky Schroder's "bad boy" best friend Derek Taylor. He appeared in the Knight Rider third-season episode "Lost Knight" in 1984, and a number of other small television roles. In 1984, in response to his popularity on Silver Spoons, the show's producers gave Bateman his own starring role as Matthew Burton on the NBC sitcom It's Your Move, from September 1984 to February 1985. In 1987 he appeared with Burt Reynolds on the men's team in the inaugural week of game show Win, Lose or Draw.

Bateman earned the status of teen idol in the mid-1980s for his television work, most notably as David Hogan on The Hogan Family (originally titled Valerie and later, Valerie's Family, after Valerie Harper left the series). He became the Directors Guild of America's youngest-ever director when, at age 18, he helmed three episodes of The Hogan Family. In 1987 he gained international recognition in the motion picture sequel Teen Wolf Too, which was a box office failure. In 1994 he played opposite Katharine Hepburn and Anthony Quinn in the television film This Can't Be Love. During this period, he had roles on four seriesSimon, Chicago Sons, George & Leo, and Some of My Best Friendsnone of which lasted longer than one season. He also directed an episode of Two of a Kind in 1999. In 2002 he played the frisky sibling of Thomas Jane's character in the feature film The Sweetest Thing.

In 2003 Bateman was cast as Michael Bluth in the comedy series Arrested Development. Although critically acclaimed, the series never achieved high ratings and ended on February 10, 2006. The show was revived in spring 2013. Bateman won several awards for his work on the series, including a Golden Globe for Best Actor in a Television Series Musical or Comedy. He was also nominated in 2005 for the Emmy Award for Outstanding Actor in a Comedy Series. New episodes of Arrested Development have been released on Netflix with the original cast, including Bateman. Bateman performed commentary on the 2004 Democratic National Convention for The Majority Report with Arrested Development co-star David Cross, and hosted NBC's Saturday Night Live on February 12, 2005. In 2006 he appeared as a guest star on the Scrubs episode "My Big Bird" as Mr. Sutton, a garbage man with a flock of vicious ostriches as pets. In 2009 Bateman became a regular voice actor for the short-lived Fox comedy series Sit Down, Shut Up. He voiced Larry Littlejunk, the gym teacher and only staff member who can teach.

In 2010 Bateman and Arrested Development co-star Will Arnett created "DumbDumb Productions", a production company focusing on digital content. Their first video was "Prom Date", the first in a series of "Dirty Shorts" for Orbit. In 2012, Bateman returned to his role of Michael Bluth for the revival of Arrested Development along with the rest of the original cast. The now-Netflix-sponsored series released season4 on its Instant Watch website on May 26, 2013. The series was expected to continue its run as well as a potential feature film. For the new fourth season, Bateman was once again nominated for Outstanding Actor in a Comedy Series. Netflix confirmed that the entire cast of the show would be returning for a fifth season, which premiered on May 29, 2018 and concluded on March 15, 2019.

In 2017 Bateman returned to television as both actor and director in the Netflix drama Ozark, in which he plays a financial advisor who must relocate his family to Missouri in order to launder money for a Mexican drug cartel. Bateman's performance as Marty Byrde has drawn positive comparisons to Bryan Cranston's portrayal of Walter White in AMC's Breaking Bad.

Bateman received praise for his acceptance speech after winning the Screen Actors Guild Award for Outstanding Performance by a Male Actor in a Drama Series for Ozark. In it he states, "So I just want to say to the people that are at home and not working as frequently as they want, you're just one job away. You're plenty talented. Hang in there".

In 2021 Bateman played The Facts of Life'''s Tim Holifield in a reenactment of the third-season episode "Kids Can Be Cruel" for the third edition of Live in Front of a Studio Audience.

Film
In 2004 Bateman appeared in Dodgeball: A True Underdog Story as ESPN8 ("The Ocho") commentator Pepper Brooks, and in Starsky & Hutch as Kevin, Vince Vaughn's business partner. He reunited with Vaughn in 2006's The Break-Up. In 2007 he played former lawyer Rupert "Rip" Reed alongside Ben Affleck in Smokin' Aces, and also starred in The Kingdom, Mr. Magorium's Wonder Emporium, and Juno. In 2008 he co-starred with Will Smith and Charlize Theron in the superhero film Hancock. Bateman's 2009 films included Extract, written and directed by Mike Judge, and Couples Retreat, reuniting with Vaughn in a comedy chronicling four couples who partake in therapy sessions at a tropical island resort (Kristen Bell played his wife). In 2010 he starred in The Switch, a romantic comedy, with Jennifer Aniston. In 2011 he played the role of Special Agent Lorenzo Zoil in the comedy Paul, and starred in Horrible Bosses and The Change-Up.

In March 2012 Mansome, Bateman's first executive producer credit with Will Arnett, was announced as a Spotlight selection for the Tribeca Film Festival. The documentary, directed by Morgan Spurlock, is a comedic look at male identity as it is defined through men's grooming habits, featuring celebrity and expert commentary. He made a dramatic turn in 2012 with the thriller film Disconnect, and starred in the 2013 comedy film Identity Thief and the 2014 comedies This Is Where I Leave You and Horrible Bosses 2. He also narrated the 2014 documentary Pump. In 2015 Bateman headlined Joel Edgerton's thriller film The Gift, opposite Rebecca Hall and Edgerton. His production company Aggregate Films extended its deal with Universal.

In 2013 Bateman made his feature film directorial debut with Bad Words, in which he also starred. He also directed and starred in an adaptation of The Family Fang. Bateman voiced Nick Wilde, the con artist fox in Zootopia. In 2018 he starred in and produced the action comedy film Game Night. His performance was widely praised and he received nominations for best performance by a comedic actor at the San Diego Film Critics Society Awards and the Critics' Choice Awards.

Bateman is in the video for the Mumford and Sons song "Hopeless Wanderer".

In 2020, Bateman was originally set to co-star and direct Clue with Ryan Reynolds. He has since had to back out, reportedly due to schedule conflicts Ozark. In March 2022, Bateman signed on to direct the film Project Artemis, starring Scarlett Johansson, for Apple Studios, but departed the project in June due to creative differences; he was eventually replaced as director by Greg Berlanti. Announced in September 2022, Bateman is tapped to direct Netflix's Dark Wire, a film based on Joseph Cox's novel of the same name. In January 2023, Bateman signed on to direct The Pinkerton for Warner Bros. Pictures and Bad Robot Productions, and will also serve as executive producer.

Podcast
In July 2020 Bateman, along with Will Arnett and Sean Hayes, created a comedy and talk podcast called SmartLess. In 2022, Bateman created a media company SmartLess Media in order to create four additional podcasts.

Controversy
Bateman, along with Arrested Development co-stars David Cross and Tony Hale, was criticized for seemingly defending Jeffrey Tambor's volatile behavior on the set of Arrested Development. During a May 2018 cast interview for The New York Times Bateman attempted to defuse the controversy:
"Again, not to belittle it or excuse it or anything, but in the entertainment industry it is incredibly common to have people who are, in quotes, 'difficult'. And when you're in a privileged position to hire people... you learn about character and you learn about work habits, work ethics, and you start to understand. Because it's a very amorphous process, this sort of [expletive] that we do, you know, making up fake life. It's a weird thing, and it is a breeding ground for atypical behavior and certain people have certain processes."

During the interview, Jessica Walter held back tears while speaking of Tambor (who was present), insisting that the two had made amends after the incident.
"Verbally, yes, he (Tambor) harassed me, but he did apologize," she said, adding "Jason says this happens all the time. But, in like almost sixty years of working, I've never had anybody yell at me like that on a set. And it's hard to deal with, but I'm over it now. I just let it go right here... for The New York Times."

Within days after the interview, all three men issued apologies to Walter. Bateman retrospectively stated he had overreached in his attempt to analyze the cause of Tambor's behavior. In an interview with Time, Bateman was quoted saying, "I always thought it's important for people to treat one another with respect at work, no matter what industry you're in. The whole experience has allowed me to do a lot of listening, and I continue that to this day."

Personal life

In 1987 Bateman won the celebrity portion of the Long Beach Grand Prix.

Bateman married actress Amanda Anka, daughter of singer Paul Anka, on July 3, 2001. They have two daughters.

Throughout the 1990s Bateman struggled with an addiction to alcohol and drugs; he stated in a 2009 interview: "I'd worked so hard that by the time I was 20, I wanted to play hard. And I did that really well... it was like Risky Business for ten years."

Bateman is a fan of the Los Angeles Dodgers baseball team.

Filmography

Awards and nominations

Notes

References

Further reading
Dye, David. Child and Youth Actors: Filmography of Their Entire Careers, 1914–1985. Jefferson, NC: McFarland & Co., 1988, p.13.
Holmstrom, John. The Moving Picture Boy: An International Encyclopaedia from 1895 to 1995''. Norwich, Michael Russell, 1996, p.373.

External links

1969 births
Living people
20th-century American male actors
21st-century American male actors
Film producers from New York (state)
American male child actors
American male film actors
American male television actors
American male voice actors
American people of English descent
American film directors
American television directors
Annie Award winners
Audiobook narrators
Best Musical or Comedy Actor Golden Globe (television) winners
Male actors from New York (state)
People from Rye, New York
Male actors from Salt Lake City
Outstanding Performance by a Male Actor in a Drama Series Screen Actors Guild Award winners
Primetime Emmy Award winners